"My Party" is the debut single by German female singer, DJ and musician DJane HouseKat featuring vocals from Rameez. The single was released digitally on March 19, 2012 in Germany. The song was written by Axel Konrad, Alvin J. Fields, Michael James Zager and Chima Rameez Okpalaugo (Rameez).  It is based on the 1978 Michael Zager Band hit "Let's All Chant".

Music video
A music video to accompany the release of "My Party" was first released onto YouTube on 23 January 2012 at a total length of three minutes and nineteen seconds.

Track listing

Chart performance

Year-end charts

Release history

References

2012 singles
DJane HouseKat songs
Songs written by Michael Zager
Sony Music singles
2011 songs